Goldsboro is an unincorporated community in northwest Coleman County, Texas, United States. According to the Handbook of Texas, the community had an estimated population of 30 in 2000.  

While Goldsboro received an influx of population from the nearby town of Tokeen when the railroad arrived, both communities are now considered rural remnants of the original towns.

References

Unincorporated communities in Coleman County, Texas
Unincorporated communities in Texas